Alleyrat is a commune in the Creuse department of the Nouvelle-Aquitaine region in central France. The current mayor is Guy Brunet, in office since 2014 and re-elected in 2020.

Geography

Population

Sights
 A church dating from the 12th century
 The ruins of Laubard castle
 The chapel of St. Madeleine

See also
Communes of the Creuse department

References

Communes of Creuse